Valley County is a rural county located in the U.S. state of Idaho. As of the 2020 census, the population was 11,746. The county seat is Cascade, and the largest city is McCall. The valley was formerly a summer pasture for livestock from the Boise Valley. Since the completion of the Cascade Dam in 1948, much of the northern valley has been covered by the Cascade Reservoir.

Valley County is home to the Idaho ground squirrel.

History
Packer John Welch, who had contracted to freight supplies to miners of Idaho City, established a camp on Gold Fork Creek and a brush cabin on Clear Creek in the 1860s. He also established a station near what later became the town of Cascade.

During the 1870s, prospectors and miners started searching for gold. The Clara Foltz mines opened on Paddy Flat, and other diggings commenced on Boulder and Gold Fork Creeks. 
In the late 1870s, the last of the Sheepeater Tribe was removed from Long Valley and Round Valley to a reservation. As the gold sources dwindled, a few of the miners took up squatter's rights. James Horner built a cabin on Clear Creek in 1881, other miners settled on the Payette River.

Also in 1888, the first post offices in Valley County were opened at VanWyck, another one opened at Lardo in 1889. That same year Louis McCall and other settlers took squatter's rights on Payette Lake. Their homesteads were the nucleus of what would later become the town of McCall. A freight stop was established at Lardo to service the increased mining activity at Warren Meadows.

The 1890 census stated 538 people resided in the VanWyck precinct, and 110 resided in the Alpha precinct. Land survey maps drawn in the 1890s show four schools. The maps also point out sawmills at Warner's Pond and on Gold Fork Creek. A small reservoir near VanWyck can also be seen on them. The 1890s were a period of strife for the new settlers. Ranchers from south of Long Valley annually brought their large herds of cattle to graze in Long Valley. The homesteaders resented the intrusion and retaliated on several occasions by slaughtering the outsiders' cattle.

Gold was first discovered in the Thunder Mountain area in 1893, W.H. Dewey began mining on a large scale in 1902. As many as 3,000 miners swarmed into the region.

From the 1910s onwards, logging became, along with farming and ranching, the economic mainstay of Long Valley. Towns distant from the railroad, such as Alpha, Crawford and Roseberry, soon lost their vitality and died. Towns near the railroad, such as Cascade, Donnelly and McCall, thrived and became the population centers of Valley County.

The Stibnite Mining District, located near Yellow Pine, was critical to the country's war effort during World War II.

Geography
It is the fifth-largest county in Idaho by area.

Adjacent counties
 Idaho County - north
 Adams County - west
 Gem County - southwest
 Boise County - south
 Custer County - east
 Lemhi County - east

National protected areas
 Boise National Forest (part)
 Payette National Forest (part)
 Salmon-Challis National Forest (part)

Transportation

Highways
 - Payette River Scenic Byway
The county's primary highway is the north–south State Highway 55, the Payette River Scenic Byway, a designated national scenic byway. It heads north from Eagle in Ada County to Horseshoe Bend in Boise County, and climbs the whitewater of the Payette River to Cascade and McCall. The route turns west at Payette Lake in McCall and ends at New Meadows in Adams County, at the junction with US-95.

Airports
The county has public-use airports owned by the state, by the U.S. Forest Service, and by local municipalities.

 Bernard USFS Airport (U54)
 Big Creek Airport (U60)
 Bruce Meadows Airport (U63)
 Cabin Creek USFS Airport (I08)
 Cascade Airport (U70)
 Donald D. Coski Memorial Airport (U84)
 Indian Creek USFS Airport (S81)
 Johnson Creek Airport (3U2)
 Krassel USFS Airport (24K)
 Landmark USFS Airport (0U0)
 Mahoney Creek USFS Airport (0U3)
 McCall Municipal Airport (MYL)
 Soldier Bar USFS Airport (85U)
 Thomas Creek Airport (2U8)

Government and politics
Valley County has long been a Republican stronghold, though it currently gives Democrats larger vote shares than most of Idaho. In 2004, George Bush defeated John Kerry by a 21-point margin (59-38%), whilst in 2008, Valley County was much more competitive than in previous elections, as John McCain defeated Barack Obama by only 7 points (52-45%). Democratic strength is entirely centered around the tourist town of McCall and the surrounding area around the Payette Lake, while the rest of the county remains strongly Republican.

Demographics

2000 census
As of the census of 2000, there were 7,651 people, 3,208 households, and 2,252 families living in the county. The population density was 2 people per square mile (1/km2). There were 8,084 housing units at an average density of 2 per square mile (1/km2). The racial makeup of the county was 96.43% White, 0.69% Native American, 0.30% Asian, 0.04% Black or African American, 0.04% Pacific Islander, 1.10% from other races, and 1.40% from two or more races. 1.96% of the population were Hispanic or Latino of any race. 19.1% were of German, 16.4% English, 11.3% American and 10.1% Irish ancestry.

There were 3208 households, out of which 28.10% had children under the age of 18 living with them, 60.90% were married couples living together, 5.40% had a female householder with no husband present, and 29.80% were non-families. 24.80% of all households were made up of individuals, and 7.90% had someone living alone who was 65 years of age or older. The average household size was 2.36 and the average family size was 2.81.

In the county, the population was spread out, with 23.70% under the age of 18, 4.40% from 18 to 24, 24.90% from 25 to 44, 32.20% from 45 to 64, and 14.80% who were 65 years of age or older. The median age was 44 years. For every 100 females there were 105.90 males. For every 100 females age 18 and over, there were 104.40 males.

The median income for a household in the county was $36,927, and the median income for a family was $42,283. Males had a median income of $31,113 versus $21,777 for females. The per capita income for the county was $19,246. About 6.20% of families and 9.30% of the population were below the poverty line, including 10.10% of those under age 18 and 5.60% of those age 65 or over.

2010 census
As of the 2010 United States Census, there were 9,862 people, 4,393 households, and 2,870 families living in the county. The racial makeup of the county was 95.8% white, 0.7% American Indian, 0.4% Asian, 0.1% black or African American, 1.6% from other races, and 1.4% from two or more races. Those of Hispanic or Latino origin made up 3.9% of the population. In terms of ancestry, 33.9% were German, 19.3% were English, 12.8% were Irish, 7.6% were American, and 5.5% were Scottish.

Of the 4,393 households, 24.1% had children under the age of 18 living with them, 55.8% were married couples living together, 6.0% had a female householder with no husband present, 34.7% were non-families, and 27.9% of all households were made up of individuals. The average household size was 2.23 and the average family size was 2.71. The median age was 46.9 years.

The median income for a household in the county was $50,851 and the median income for a family was $59,737. Males had a median income of $40,917 versus $35,876 for females. The per capita income for the county was $27,577. About 11.5% of families and 15.4% of the population were below the poverty line, including 29.0% of those under age 18 and 7.3% of those age 65 or over.

Communities

Cities
Cascade
Donnelly
McCall

Census-designated places
 Smiths Ferry
 Yellow Pine

Other unincorporated communities
 Big Creek
 Lake Fork
 Roseberry
 Warm Lake

Ski areas
Brundage Mountain (1961)
Little Ski Hill (1937)
Tamarack Resort (2004)

See also
National Register of Historic Places listings in Valley County, Idaho

References

External links

County Parcel Map
State of Idaho official site - Valley County

 

 
Idaho counties
1917 establishments in Idaho
Populated places established in 1917